Achalader is a settlement in the  council area of Perth and Kinross, Scotland.

References

Villages in Perth and Kinross